Pierre Coppieters (born 24 June 1907, date of death unknown) was a Belgian swimmer and water polo player who competed in the 1928 and 1936 Summer Olympics.

See also
 List of Olympic medalists in water polo (men)

References

External links
 

1907 births
Year of death missing
Belgian male water polo players
Belgian male freestyle swimmers
Olympic water polo players of Belgium
Olympic swimmers of Belgium
Water polo players at the 1928 Summer Olympics
Swimmers at the 1928 Summer Olympics
Water polo players at the 1936 Summer Olympics
Olympic bronze medalists for Belgium
Olympic medalists in water polo
Medalists at the 1936 Summer Olympics
20th-century Belgian people